Gary Farrelly (born 1983) is a contemporary Irish artist based in Brussels.

Career
 
 
Farrelly graduated from the National College of Art and Design in Dublin in 2006. His work involves a recurring fixation with narcissistic, utopic, and infrastructural themes.

He was the subject of and star of the 2018 film work GLUE, a "50-minute portrait of the director Oisín Byrne’s friend and longtime collaborator, a quick-witted and acid-tongued cross-dresser who refuses to adhere to a fixed identity." Additionally, Farrelly, with Chris Dreier, is part of the artistic collaboration: "Office for Joint Administrative Intelligence".

Notes and references

External links
 Official web site

1983 births
20th-century Irish painters
21st-century Irish painters
Irish male painters
Living people
Alumni of the National College of Art and Design
Artists from Dublin (city)
Irish contemporary artists
20th-century Irish male artists